Trigonopterus obelix is a species of flightless weevil in the genus Trigonopterus endemic to Sulawesi, Indonesia. It was named after one of the main characters in the Asterix comic. It was described in 2019.

References 

obelix
Beetles of Asia
Insects of Indonesia
Endemic fauna of Indonesia